Longeumolpus is a genus of leaf beetles in the subfamily Eumolpinae. It is mainly found in South America, though the type species (Longeumolpus imperialis) has also been reported from Martinique in the Lesser Antilles of the West Indies. The genus was established in 1960 by the Czech entomologist Bohumila Špringlová de Bechyně (wife of Jan Bechyně) as a close relative of Eumolpus.

One of the generic characters separating Longeumolpus from Eumolpus is the length of the penis in the males: in Eumolpus, the penis is short, and always less than half the length of the abdomen, while in Longeumolpus, the penis is very long and is at least three quarters of the abdomen's length.

Species
The following species are described in Longeumolpus:

 Longeumolpus amabilis Špringlová, 1960
 Longeumolpus amabilis amabilis Špringlová, 1960
 Longeumolpus amabilis pebensis Špringlová, 1960
 Longeumolpus amabilis weyrauchi Špringlová, 1960
 Longeumolpus batesi (Baly, 1877)
 Longeumolpus batesi batesi (Baly, 1877)
 Longeumolpus batesi benjaminus Špringlová, 1960
 Longeumolpus bolivianus Špringlová, 1960
 Longeumolpus carinatus (Baly, 1877)
 Longeumolpus compar Špringlová, 1960
 Longeumolpus dimorphus Špringlová, 1960
 Longeumolpus emigratus Špringlová, 1960
 Longeumolpus emigratus emigratus Špringlová, 1960
 Longeumolpus emigratus mesosternalis Špringlová, 1960
 Longeumolpus ferox Špringlová, 1960
 Longeumolpus ferox borbensis Špringlová, 1960
 Longeumolpus ferox ferox Špringlová, 1960
 Longeumolpus ferox parkoi Špringlová, 1960
 Longeumolpus imperialis (Baly, 1877)
 Longeumolpus laeviusculus Špringlová, 1960
 Longeumolpus laeviusculus corpulentus Špringlová, 1960
 Longeumolpus laeviusculus discocostatus Špringlová, 1960
 Longeumolpus laeviusculus laeviusculus Špringlová, 1960
 Longeumolpus laeviusculus manesus Špringlová, 1960
 Longeumolpus prasinus (Erichson, 1847)
 Longeumolpus spathulatus Špringlová, 1960
 Longeumolpus speciosus (Baly, 1877)
 Longeumolpus stenotypus Špringlová, 1960
 Longeumolpus subcostatus (Lefèvre, 1885)
 Longeumolpus subcostatus sabanillensis Špringlová, 1960
 Longeumolpus subcostatus subcostatus (Lefèvre, 1885)

References

Chrysomelidae genera
Eumolpinae
Beetles of North America
Beetles of South America